Mahomet is an unincorporated community in Burnet County, Texas, United States. According to the Handbook of Texas, the community had an estimated population of 47 in 2000.

History
Mahomet had two sites in eastern Burnet County. George Ater settled here in 1853 and named the area for Mahomet, Illinois. A railroad track bypassed his home en route between Austin to Lampasas in 1855. A post office was established at Mahomet in 1857 and remained in operation until 1916. It operated in Ater's home for 25 years. The Austin and Northwestern Railroad bypassed Mahomet in 1882. The post office was then relocated to Alex M. Ramsey's home in Sycamore Springs, which became the second site of Mahomet. Mail was then sent to the community from Bertram. The community had a cotton gin, a corn mill, a church, and 50 inhabitants in 1884. Farmers in the area shipped cotton and wool. The population then grew to 60 in 1890, then dropped to 10 six years later. It went up to 40 in the late 1930s with two businesses, then went up to 75 in the 1960s. A church, a community center, and a cemetery marked the community on highway maps in the late 1980s. The population was 47 from 1974 through 2000.

Geography

Education
Mahomet had its own school in 1884. Today, Mahomet is served by the Burnet Consolidated Independent School District.

References

Unincorporated communities in Burnet County, Texas
Unincorporated communities in Texas